National Memorial Cemetery of The Victims of Homeland War in Vukovar is the largest mass grave in Croatia and in Europe after the Second World War, located on the eastern approach to Vukovar.

History
By the conclusion of the Government of the Republic of Croatia in April 1998, the Operational Headquarters for exhumations, identifications and burials of victims from the mass grave at the New Cemetery in Vukovar was established; parallel to the process of exhumation and identification of the victims, the arrangement of the Cemetery of Croatian Veterans from the Homeland War - today's Memorial Cemetery for the Victims of the Homeland War in Vukovar - began. The entire area of today's cemetery had to be demined first, and then the forested area of about 60,000 m2 had to be cleared. By the conclusion of the Government of the Republic of Croatia of November 16, 2000. In 2010, the cemetery was given the status of "Memorial Cemetery of the Victims of the Homeland War".

Cemetery
938 bodies were exhumed at the cemetery and 938 white crosses were placed on that spot. A monument by Đurđa Ostoja was erected in the central part of the cemetery on August 5, 2000 . The monument is made of patinated bronze, it is four meters high, and in the middle is an "air" cross and an Eternal Flame. Two crosses were also set up at the cemetery, one for the youngest victim of the Croatian War of Independence, Ivan Kljajić, who was only six months old, and for the oldest victim of the Homeland War, a woman who was 104 years old.

References

Croatian War of Independence
Buildings and structures in Vukovar
Cemeteries in Croatia